Parliamentary elections were held in Hungary in 1861. The Address Party won a majority of the seats.

Results

References

Elections in Hungary
Elections in Austria-Hungary
Hungary